Pin trading is the practice of buying, selling, and exchanging collectible pins – most often lapel pins associated with a particular common theme, as well as related items – such as lanyards, bags, and hats to store and display the pins – as a hobby.  Collectible pins used in pin trading are often found in amusement parks and resorts; the Walt Disney World and Disneyland resorts, for example, are venues where Disney pin trading has become a popular activity, and similar pin trading activities are popular at comparable venues such as SeaWorld, Universal Resorts, and at Six Flags theme parks.  They are also found at events that are recurring and/or share a common theme, such as the Olympic Games and other sporting events.  The pins collected and traded are often of a limited edition and thus more highly valued in pin trading, and are sometimes marked or distributed by various companies such as The Coca-Cola Company who sponsor the events and venues associated with the traded pins.  Pin trading at particular venues and events is often governed by rules of etiquette particular to the venue or occasion.

Pin trading is also an annual tradition of the Pasadena Tournament of Roses Game and Parade. Participating teams, marching bands, floats, sponsors, and the parade's Grand Marshal each have their own custom pin.

Many clubs, sports teams, events, and churches trade and collect custom pins that were made specifically for their organization. Quick manufacturing processes allow these pins to be produced at a low cost and in small quantities. Collections of these pins are often worn by the collector on an article of clothing such as a hat, vest, scarf, or a PinFolio.

Pin trading and collecting may have originated with the sport of curling as some of the oldest pins that could be described as trading pins are from curling clubs dating back to the mid nineteenth-century.

Pin trading also has a long standing history in Baseball. It is common for little leagues trade team pins during the Little League World Series.

Pin trading often has specialist categories of pins to trade in – some popular categories include Golly pins from Robertson's Jam, Hard Rock Café, Disney, political pins, sports pins (including bowling, rugby, the Olympic Games and soccer), military or other categories including flags of countries. Motorcycling is also a popular theme for pin trading.

While most trading pins are typically flat with a glossy finish, there are many trading pin accessories to accommodate any sports team or corporate brand. Common features include blinking lights, hanging charms or "danglers", spinners, bobble heads, and more. Pin manufacturers are known to use a large variety of these features when designing pins.

See also
 Campaign button
 Pin-back button

References

Collecting
Badges
Fashion accessories